Grant Manzoney (born 16 December 1969) is an Australian Paralympic badminton player. He competed at the 2020 Summer Paralympics where badminton made its Paralympics debut.

Personal
Manzoney was born on 16 December 1969 with congenital deformity in both legs. His right leg is missing and fibular hemimelia in his left leg causing severe deformity of his left foot and ankle. Surgery at an early age has allowed him to walk on his left foot instead of amputation. He has a prosthetic right leg since childhood.He attended Swan View Senior High School.

Badminton
After dabbling in wheelchair basketball, he discovered para-badminton in 2016 as part of Wheelchair Sports held a 'come and try day'. He is classified WH2.He has earned number one rankings in Oceania and Australia in singles and doubles in his class.

He participated at the 2019 BWF Para-Badminton World Championships, Basel, where he won one match and lost two and did not reach the knockout stage.

In 2020, he defended his Oceania Para Badminton Championships Men's WH2 title.

At the 2020 Tokyo Paralympics,he competed in the Men's singles WH2. His first opponent in the Group Stage was Kim Kjung-hoon from Korea. He lost 2-0. He then competed against Kim Jung-Jun also from Korea. Here he also lost 2-0.  Manzoney therefore did not make the quarterfinals.  

His coach in Perth is Mark Cunningham.

Achievements

Oceania Championships 
Men's singles

Men's doubles

Doubles

Mixed doubles

References

Notes

External links

Badminton World Federation Profile

1969 births
Living people
Australian male badminton players
Paralympic badminton players of Australia
Badminton players at the 2020 Summer Paralympics
Australian para-badminton players